The Iraqis is an Iraqi political party led by Vice-President Ghazi al-Yawar.  It was the largest Sunni party to participate in the January 2005 Iraqi election.  During the election campaign, al-Yawar was President of Iraq, a then largely symbolic but still prominent position.

The party consists of an alliance of Sunni tribal leaders, led by those of al-Yawar's Shammar tribe.  Its eighty-candidate list contains several prominent Shi'ites.  Due in large part to the low Sunni turnout, the party received only 150,000 votes in the election, placing them fourth in overall support, at 1.78% of votes cast, earning them five seats in the transitional National Assembly of Iraq.

Prior to the December 2005 elections The Iraqis agreed to merge their list with the Iraqi List of Iyad Allawi, forming the Iraqi National List.

The party took part in the 2010 parliamentary election as part of the Iraqi National Movement coalition, and won 6 seats. In the 2014 parliamentary election the party didn't win any seats.

Political parties in Iraq